Sir John Middleton,  (1870 – 5 November 1954) was a British colonial administrator.

Middleton joined the Colonial Office in 1901, serving in south Nigeria for six years as a junior official before moving on to Mauritius until 1920 when he was promoted to governor of the Falkland Islands from 1920 to 1927, Gambia from 1927 to 1928 and Newfoundland from 1928 to 1932.

He was Governor of Newfoundland during a period of acute political crisis that was exacerbated by the Great Depression. In 1932, he was asked to investigate allegations that the Prime Minister of Newfoundland, Sir Richard Squires had falsified cabinet minutes in an attempt to coverup evidence of corruption involving his government. Middleton's conclusions that there was no sign of tampering resulted in a riot outside his office on 5 April 1932 that helped bring down the Squires government. Middleton retired from public life following his term in Newfoundland and returned to England.

See also 
 Governors of Newfoundland
 List of people of Newfoundland and Labrador

External links
 Biography at Government House The Governorship of Newfoundland and Labrador

1870 births
1954 deaths
Governors of the Falkland Islands
Governors of the Dominion of Newfoundland
Governors of the Gambia
Governors of British Mauritius
Companions of the Order of St Michael and St George
Knights Commander of the Order of the British Empire
People from colonial Nigeria
British expatriates in Nigeria
British expatriates in Mauritius